Mark Ian Phillips (born 27 January 1982, Lambeth) is a retired professional footballer who played in the Football League for Southend United, Millwall, Brentford, Darlington and AFC Wimbledon as a defender.

Career
Phillips was signed as a youth player for Millwall at age 13 and first appeared with the senior team in September 2001. He suffered from frequent injuries and notched up just 67 league appearances during his seven years at Millwall, scoring once against Sheffield United. He was released at the end of the 2007–08 season.

Phillips signed a one-year deal for Brentford on 14 August 2008, after a successful trial spell and played regularly for the first team after James Wilson's loan had expired. He ended up being an important member of the Brentford League Two winners squad and signed a new contract at the conclusion of the 2008–09 season. He scored his first and only goal for the club in a 1–1 draw with Notts County.

He was released by Brentford on 11 May 2010, along with three other players.

Phillips trialled with League Two side Southend United in July 2010. On 31 July, Phillips signed a pre-contract agreement for Southend United. On 4 August 2010, Southend's transfer embargo was lifted and Phillips signed a two-year contract.

Phillips started Southend's first game of the season against Stockport County on 7 August 2010 and on 14 August 2010 against Aldershot Town. Since then Phillips has been plagued by groin injuries which required surgery. In January 2011 Phillips returned to full training.

In 2011–12, Phillips regained his place in the starting XI for Southend and formed a solid partnership at centre back with club captain Chris Barker. Despite a few small injuries, Phillips has remained a permanent fixture in the Blues back four and was named captain for the abandoned game against Aldershot on Boxing Day 2011. At the end of the 2011–12 season, Phillips was named Player of the year down to his frequent strong performances.

On 27 March 2014, Phillips joined Conference side Aldershot Town on loan for the remainder of the 2013–14 season.

On 23 June 2014, Phillips joined AFC Wimbledon on a free transfer.

Phillips re-joined Aldershot Town on loan on 3 October 2014.

Personal life 
Phillips is a Millwall supporter.

Career statistics

Honours

As a player 
Brentford
Football League Two: 2008–09

As an individual 
 Southend United Player of the Year: 2011–12

References

External links
 
 

1982 births
Living people
Footballers from Lambeth
English footballers
Association football defenders
Millwall F.C. players
Darlington F.C. players
Brentford F.C. players
Southend United F.C. players
Aldershot Town F.C. players
AFC Wimbledon players
Braintree Town F.C. players
English Football League players
National League (English football) players
Kingstonian F.C. players